Aiskew is a village in the civil parish of Aiskew and Leeming Bar, in the Hambleton District of North Yorkshire, England.  The village is situated to the immediate north-east of Bedale and separated from it by Bedale Beck.

History

Remains of a Roman Villa were unearthed, in 2015, north of Sand Hill in the village. The building is thought to have been two storeys high with a hypocaust on the ground floor. Animal remains were found extensively across the site. It is thought the site dated from the third to fourth century AD and would have been situated along Dere Street. The site was covered as part of the construction of the Bedale, Aiskew and Leeming Bar by-pass, which opened on 11 August 2016 as part of the upgrade to the A1(M).

The village was known as Echescol in the Domesday Book in the Hundred of Count Alan of Brittany, the previous Lord having been Gospatric. The village had 7 ploughlands. The Lordship of the Manor followed that of neighbouring Bedale. The name is derived from Old Norse words eik (oak) and skógr (wood) and means Oak wood.

In 2013 Masons Gin established a distillery in the village.

Governance

The village lies within the Richmond Parliamentary constituency, the Bedale ward of Hambleton District Council and the Bedale Electoral Division of North Yorkshire County Council. Aiskew Civil Parish includes the village of Leeming Bar.

Demography

According to the 2001 UK Census, the population was 2,163 living in 863 dwellings. The 2011 UK Census showed this had increased to 2,427 in 985 dwellings.

Community

The village is in the Primary Education Catchment Area of Bedale Church of England Primary School, though it is also close to Aiskew, Leeming Bar Church of England Primary School, in Leeming Bar. It is within the Secondary Education Catchment Area of Bedale High School.

The Wensleydale Railway, a tourist and heritage line, includes  station on the Aiskew side of Bedale Beck at the edge of the village. The signal box opposite Park House is a Grade II listed building.

In the village is an 18th-century Grade II listed water mill with all its original wooden machinery. There is also an 18th-century Leech House next to the beck.

Religion

The Catholic church in the village is dedicated to St Mary & St Joseph and was built in 1878, designed by Mr George Goldie of London, after the original Chapel became too small for the congregation.

There had been both a Baptist church and Primitive Methodist Chapel in the village.

The Methodist Church in Aiskew, which was part of the Ripon & Lower Dales Methodist Circuit, has closed and the congregation merged with the Bedale & District Methodist Church.

References

External links
 

Villages in North Yorkshire
Hambleton District